The 2000 Lamar Hunt U.S. Open Cup ran from June through October, 2000, open to all soccer teams in the United States.

The Chicago Fire earned their second Open Cup by defeating the Miami Fusion 2–1 in the final at Soldier Field, Chicago.

Amateur club Uruguay SC narrowly missed a major second-round upset, losing in overtime to the Tampa Bay Mutiny. Two PDL teams - the Mid Michigan Bucks and the Chicago Sockers - beat MLS teams in the second round, but the quarterfinals were an all-MLS affair. Mid Michigan came closest to duplicating its second-round upset, losing in a shootout to eventual runner-up Miami.
Two referees were used for all games from the second round through the semifinals as part of a FIFA experiment.

Open Cup Bracket
Home teams listed on top of bracket

Schedule
Note: Scorelines use the standard U.S. convention of placing the home team on the right-hand side of box scores.

First round
Four PDL and four USASA teams start.

Second round
Twelve MLS, nine A-League, seven D3 Pro League teams enter.

Third round

Quarterfinals

Semifinals

Final

Top scorers

See also
 United States Soccer Federation
 Lamar Hunt U.S. Open Cup
 Major League Soccer
 United Soccer Leagues
 USASA
 National Premier Soccer League

2000 domestic association football cups
2000
Cup